An amateur radio operating award is earned by an amateur radio operator for establishing two-way communication (or "working") with other amateur radio stations.  Awards are sponsored by national amateur radio societies, radio enthusiast magazines, or amateur radio clubs, and aim to promote activity on the amateur radio bands.  Each award has its own set of rules and fees.  Some awards require the amateur radio operator to have contacted other stations in a certain number of countries, Maidenhead grid locators, or counties.  Because amateur radio operators are forbidden by regulation to accept financial compensation for their on-air activity, award recipients generally only receive a certificate, wooden plaque, or a small trophy as recognition of their award.

Most amateur radio operating awards require that the applicant submit proof, such as QSL cards, of the contacts which satisfy the requirements of the award.

There are thousands of operating awards available.  The most popular awards are the Worked All States award and the Worked All Continents award, and the more challenging Worked All Zones, DX Century Club (DXCC), Islands on the Air (IOTA) and VHF/UHF Century Club (VUCC) awards.  DXCC is the most popular awards program, initially requiring amateurs to contact 100 of the 340 separately designated countries and territories ("entities") in the world.  (DXing is the practice of contacting distant parties.) Other popular awards include contacting remote islands, beaches, US counties, and lighthouses. Many awards are available for contacting amateurs in a particular country, region or city.  Summits On The Air, or SOTA, tallies points towards awards to hams who broadcast from mountain elevations or make contact with those transmitting from them, for which events are scheduled periodically.

Special event stations

Many amateurs also enjoy setting up and contacting special event stations. Set up to commemorate special occurrences, they often issue distinctive QSLs or certificates.  Some use unusual prefixes, such as the call signs with "96" that amateurs in the US State of Georgia could use during the 1996 Atlanta Olympics, or the OO prefix used by Belgian amateurs in 2005 to commemorate their nation's 175th anniversary.   (Not surprisingly, there are also awards for working sufficient numbers of prefixes.)  Some events are held annually such as Guides on the Air and Jamboree on the Air. Many amateurs decorate their radio "shacks" (the room where they keep their radios) with these certificates.

See also 
Parks On The Air
Summits On The Air

References

External links
 St Patricks Award
 Užice Award
 Summits On The Air (UK site open to hams internationally) 
 Summits On The Air Italia (IT site open to hams internationally)
 Islands on the Air (UK site open to hams internationally)